Banjar, is a city located in the east of West Java, Indonesia, on the border between West Java and Central Java. This city is also known as Banjar Patroman or Pataruman.

Administrative districts
The city of Banjar is divided into four administrative districts (Indonesian: kecamatan), tabulated below with their areas and their populations at the 2010 census and the 2020 census, together with the official estimate as at mid 2021. The table also includes the location of the district administrative centres, the number of administrative villages (urban kelurahan) in each district, and its postal codes.

Transportation

Rail transport
The track has several old stations with class I, II, and III categories, has three tunnels (one of them, the Wilhemina tunnel, with a length of 1,116 metres, is the longest tunnel in Indonesia); it also has the longest (Cikacepit) bridge in Indonesia, with a length of 1,250 metres and a height of 100 metres above the ground. The rail authority has announced their intention to re-activate the train service, and will restore  and Cijulang stations while still keeping their original features.

Climate
Banjar has a tropical rainforest climate (Af) with heavy to very heavy rainfall year-round.

References

External links